The 2007 Cincinnati Reds season was the 138th season for the franchise in Major League Baseball, and their 5th season at Great American Ball Park in Cincinnati. The Reds failed on a bid to win the NL Central, falling out of serious contention by midseason and finishing in 5th place with a 72-90 record.

Following an 11–7 loss to the St. Louis Cardinals on July 1, general manager Wayne Krivsky fired manager Jerry Narron and named advance scout Pete Mackanin interim manager. It was the second managerial change of the day, following the resignation of Seattle Mariners skipper Mike Hargrove. The Reds won Mackanin's first game at the helm, 7–3 over the San Francisco Giants on the strength of a grand slam by Brandon Phillips.

The season also included highlights such as the Reds 2004 first-round draft pick, right-handed starting pitcher Homer Bailey making his MLB debut against the Indians on June 8. He pitched 5 innings, gave up 2 earned runs, struck out 3, and walked 4.

Offseason
November 20, 2006: Mike Stanton was signed as a free agent.
December 7, 2006: Josh Hamilton was purchased by the  Reds from the Chicago Cubs.
December 7, 2006: Jared Burton was drafted by the Reds from the Oakland Athletics in the 2006 rule 5 draft.

Regular season

Season standings

National League Central

Record vs. opponents

Roster

Game log

|- style="text-align:center; background:#bfb;"
|1||April 2||Cubs||5–1||Harang (1–0)||Zambrano (0–1)||||42,720||1–0
|- style="text-align:center; background:#fbb;"
|2||April 4||Cubs||4–1||Lilly (1–0)||Arroyo (0–1)||Dempster (1)||25,965||1–1
|- style="text-align:center; background:#bfb;"
|3||April 5||Cubs||5–2||Santos (1–0)||Howry (0–1)||Weathers (1)||25,070||2–1
|- style="text-align:center; background:#bfb;"
|4||April 6||Pirates||6–1||Belisle (1–0)||Maholm (0–1)||||17,837||3–1
|- style="text-align:center; background:#bfb;"
|5||April 7||Pirates||7–5||Harang (2–0)||Armas (0–1)||Weathers (2)||15,825||4–1
|- style="text-align:center; background:#fbb;"
|6||April 8||Pirates||6–3||Duke (1–0)||Milton (0–1)||Torres (4)||14,001||4–2
|- style="text-align:center; background:#fbb;"
|7||April 9||@ D-backs||3–2||Lyon (1–0)||Saarloos (0–1)||Valverde (4)||41,803||4–3
|- style="text-align:center; background:#fbb;"
|8||April 10||@ D-backs||5–4 ||Cruz (2–0)||Weathers (0–1)||||21,225||4–4
|- style="text-align:center; background:#bfb;"
|9||April 11||@ D-backs||3–2||Belisle (2–0)||Owings (1–1)||Weathers (3)||19,534||5–4
|- style="text-align:center; background:#bfb;"
|10||April 13||@ Cubs||6–5||Coffey (1–0)||Zambrano (1–2)||Weathers (4)||37,267||6–4
|- style="text-align:center; background:#fbb;"
|11||April 14||@ Cubs||7–0||Hill (2–0)||Arroyo (0–2)||||38,598||6–5
|- style="text-align:center; background:#bfb;"
|12||April 15||@ Cubs||1–0||Lohse (1–0)||Lilly (1–1)||Weathers (5)||39,820||7–5
|- style="text-align:center; background:#fbb;"
|13||April 16||Brewers||10–6||Capuano (2–0)||Milton (0–2)||||12,521||7–6
|- style="text-align:center; background:#bfb;"
|14||April 17||Brewers||11–5||Stanton (1–0)||Shouse (1–1)||||14,492||8–6
|- style="text-align:center; background:#fbb;"
|15||April 18||Astros||7–2||Sampson (2–0)||Coffey (1–1)||||13,772||8–7
|- style="text-align:center; background:#fbb;"
|16||April 19||Astros||8–6||Lidge (1–0)||Weathers (0–2)||Wheeler (3)||14,222||8–8
|- style="text-align:center; background:#bfb;"
|17||April 20||Phillies||2–1 ||Coutlangus (1–0)||Gordon (0–1)||||32,962||9–8
|- style="text-align:center; background:#fbb;"
|18||April 21||Phillies||4–1||Hamels (1–0)||Milton (0–3)||||39,353||9–9
|- style="text-align:center; background:#fbb;"
|19||April 22||Phillies||9–3||García (1–1)||Belisle (2–1)||||29,717||9–10
|- style="text-align:center; background:#bfb;"
|20||April 24||@ Cardinals||10–3||Harang (3–0)||Wells (1–4)||||42,309||10–10
|- style="text-align:center; background:#fbb;"
|21||April 25||@ Cardinals||5–2||Flores (1–0)||Saarloos (0–2)||Isringhausen (5)||42,225||10–11
|- style="text-align:center; background:#fbb;"
|22||April 26||@ Cardinals||7–5||Springer (1–0)||Lohse (1–1)||Isringhausen (6)||42,503||10–12
|- style="text-align:center; background:#fbb;"
|23||April 27||@ Pirates||3–1||Snell (2–1)||Milton (0–4)||Torres (7)||22,638||10–13
|- style="text-align:center; background:#bfb;"
|24||April 28||@ Pirates||8–1||Belisle (3–1)||Gorzellany (3–1)||||29,514||11–13
|- style="text-align:center; background:#bfb;"
|25||April 29||@ Pirates||9–5||Harang (4–0)||Maholm (1–3)||||18,409||12–13

|- style="text-align:center; background:#bfb;"
|26||May 1||@ Astros||11–2||Arroyo (1–2)||Albers (0–1)||||30,361||13–13
|- style="text-align:center; background:#fbb;"
|27||May 2||@ Astros||3–1||Oswalt (4–2)||Lohse (1–2)||Wheeler (4)||29,468||13–14
|- style="text-align:center; background:#fbb;"
|28||May 3||@ Astros||7–5||Qualls (3–1)||Stanton (1–1)||Wheeler (5)||29,931||13–15
|- style="text-align:center; background:#fbb;"
|29||May 4||Rockies||6–5 ||Bautista (2–0)||Stanton (1–2)||Fuentes (6)||23,920||13–16
|- style="text-align:center; background:#fbb;"
|30||May 5||Rockies||9–7||Cook (1–1)||Harang (4–1)||Fuentes (7)||26,663||13–17
|- style="text-align:center; background:#bfb;"
|31||May 6||Rockies||9–3||Arroyo (2–2)||Fogg (1–3)||Weathers (6)||27,915||14–17
|- style="text-align:center; background:#fbb;"
|32||May 7||Astros||5–4||Oswalt (5–2)||Lohse (1–3)||Wheeler (6)||17,362||14–18
|- style="text-align:center; background:#fbb;"
|33||May 8||Astros||7–6||Lidge (2–0)||Salmon (0–1)||Wheeler (7)||16,264||14–19
|- style="text-align:center; background:#fbb;"
|34||May 9||Astros||3–2||Williams (1–5)||Belisle (3–2)||Wheeler (8)||16,278||14–20
|- style="text-align:center; background:#bfb;"
|35||May 10||Astros||9–5||Harang (5–1)||Albers (1–2)||Weathers (7)||25,796||15–20
|- style="text-align:center; background:#fbb;"
|36||May 11||@ Dodgers||2–0||Wolf (4–3)||Arroyo (2–3)||Saito (11)||49,588||15–21
|- style="text-align:center; background:#fbb;"
|37||May 12||@ Dodgers||7–3||Penny (5–0)||Lohse (1–4)||||51,776||15–22
|- style="text-align:center; background:#fbb;"
|38||May 13||@ Dodgers||10–5||Broxton (2–1)||Saarloos (0–3)||||41,399||15–23
|- style="text-align:center; background:#fbb;"
|39||May 14||@ Padres||7–1||Maddux (3–2)||Belisle (3–3)||||20,262||15–24
|- style="text-align:center; background:#bfb;"
|40||May 15||@ Padres||2–1 ||Weathers (1–2)||Bell (0–2)||||26,694||16–24
|- style="text-align:center; background:#fbb;"
|41||May 16||@ Padres||3–2||Hoffman (2–2)||Arroyo (2–4)||||23,856||16–25
|- style="text-align:center; background:#fbb;"
|42||May 18||@ Indians||9–4||Lee (2–0)||Lohse (1–5)||||34,230||16–26
|- style="text-align:center; background:#bfb;"
|43||May 19||@ Indians||10–5||Belisle (4–3)||Sowers (0–4)||Weathers (8)||35,262||17–26
|- style="text-align:center; background:#fbb;"
|44||May 20||@ Indians||5–3||Byrd (4–1)||Harang (5–2)||Borowski (13)||32,524||17–27
|- style="text-align:center; background:#bfb;"
|45||May 21||Nationals||8–7||Coutlangus (2–0)||Rauch (2–1)||Weathers (9)||15,271||18–27
|- style="text-align:center; background:#fbb;"
|46||May 22||Nationals||8–4||Colomé (4–0)||Coutlangus (2–1)||||16,732||18–28
|- style="text-align:center; background:#fbb;"
|47||May 23||Nationals||12–7||Simontacchi (2–2)||Lohse (1–6)||||31,971||18–29
|- style="text-align:center; background:#fbb;"
|48||May 24||Nationals||4–3||Bacsik (1–0)||Belisle (4–4)||Cordero (6)||19,541||18–30
|- style="text-align:center; background:#fbb;"
|49||May 25||Pirates||10–4 ||Bayliss (4–2)||Weathers (1–3)||||36,455||18–31
|- style="text-align:center; background:#fbb;"
|50||May 26||Pirates||9–5||Grabow (1–1)||Arroyo (2–5)||||32,280||18–32
|- style="text-align:center; background:#fbb;"
|51||May 27||Pirates||14–10||Duke (2–5)||Saarloos (0–4)||||27,209||18–33
|- style="text-align:center; background:#bfb;"
|52||May 28||Pirates||4–0||Lohse (2–6)||Snell (4–4)||||17,905||19–33
|- style="text-align:center; background:#bfb;"
|53||May 29||@ Astros||2–1||Belisle (5–4)||Qualls (4–2)||Weathers (10)||33,565||20–33
|- style="text-align:center; background:#bfb;"
|54||May 30||@ Astros||4–3||Harang (6–2)||Rodríguez (2–5)||||31,904||21–33
|- style="text-align:center; background:#fbb;"
|55||May 31||@ Astros||10–2||Williams (2–7)||Arroyo (2–6)||||30,336||21–34

|- style="text-align:center; background:#bfb;"
|56||June 1||@ Rockies||4–2||Livingston (1–0)||Buchholz (2–3)||Weathers (12)||22,265||22–34
|- style="text-align:center; background:#fbb;"
|57||June 2||@ Rockies||4–1||Francis (5–4)||Lohse (2–7)||Fuentes (16)||30,076||22–35
|- style="text-align:center; background:#fbb;"
|58||June 3||@ Rockies||10–9 ||Corpas (2–2)||Santos (1–1)||||26,071||22–36
|- style="text-align:center; background:#fbb;"
|59||June 5||@ Cardinals||4–3||Isringhausen (3–0)||Burton (0–1)||||43,532||22–37
|- style="text-align:center; background:#fbb;"
|60||June 6||@ Cardinals||6–4||Johnson (1–0)||Arroyo (2–7)||Isringhausen (14)||42,029||22–38
|- style="text-align:center; background:#bfb;"
|61||June 7||@ Cardinals||5–1||Lohse (3–7)||Wainwright (4–5)||||43,597||23–38
|- style="text-align:center; background:#bfb;"
|62||June 8||Indians||4–3||Bailey (1–0)||Lee (2–4)||Weathers (12)||38,696||24–38
|- style="text-align:center; background:#fbb;"
|63||June 9||Indians||8–6 ||Mastny (4–2)||Santos (1–2)||Borowski (18)||37,935||24–39
|- style="text-align:center; background:#bfb;"
|64||June 10||Indians||1–0 ||McBeth (1–0)||Miller (0–1)||||30,842||25–39
|- style="text-align:center; background:#bfb;"
|65||June 12||Angels||5–3||Coutlangus (3–1)||Moseley (4–1)||Weathers (13)||23,153||26–39
|- style="text-align:center; background:#fbb;"
|66||June 13||Angels||6–3||Lackey (10–4)||Lohse (3–8)||Rodríguez (20)||29,655||26–40
|- style="text-align:center; background:#fbb;"
|67||June 14||Angels||9–7||Colón (6–2)||Majewski (0–1)||Rodríguez (21)||32,860||26–41
|- style="text-align:center; background:#fbb;"
|68||June 15||Rangers||7–6||Padilla (3–8)||Belisle (5–5)||Gagné (7)||27,747||26–42
|- style="text-align:center; background:#bfb;"
|69||June 16||Rangers||8–4||Harang (7–2)||Wright (0–1)||||37,413||27–42
|- style="text-align:center; background:#fbb;"
|70||June 17||Rangers||11–4||Millwood (3–6)||Arroyo (2–8)||||31,162||27–43
|- style="text-align:center; background:#fbb;"
|71||June 18||@ Athletics||6–1||Blanton (7–4)||Lohse (3–9)||||16,466||27–44
|- style="text-align:center; background:#bfb;"
|72||June 19||@ Athletics||5–2||Bailey (2–0)||Gaudin (6–2)||Weathers (14)||19,351||28–44
|- style="text-align:center; background:#fbb;"
|73||June 20||@ Athletics||5–3||Haren (9–2)||McBeth (1–1)||Embree (8)||25,872||28–45
|- style="text-align:center; background:#bfb;"
|74||June 22||@ Mariners||16–1||Harang (8–2)||Feierabend (1–2)||||46,340||29–45
|- style="text-align:center; background:#fbb;"
|75||June 23||@ Mariners||9–1||Washburn (6–6)||Lohse (3–10)||||45,939||29–46
|- style="text-align:center; background:#fbb;"
|76||June 24||@ Mariners||3–2||O'Flaherty (4–0)||Arroyo (2–9)||Putz (21)||46,064||29–47
|- style="text-align:center; background:#fbb;"
|77||June 26||@ Phillies||11–4||Kendrick (2–0)||Bailey (2–1)||||35,314||29–48
|- style="text-align:center; background:#bfb;"
|78||June 27||@ Phillies||9–6||McBeth (2–1)||Sanches (1–1)||Weathers (15)||31,803||30–48
|- style="text-align:center; background:#fbb;"
|79||June 28||@ Phillies||8–7 ||Condrey (3–0)||Santos (1–3)||||44,323||30–49
|- style="text-align:center; background:#fbb;"
|80||June 29||Cardinals||4–2||Percival (1–0)||McBeth (2–2)||Isringhausen (15)||35,508||30–50
|- style="text-align:center; background:#bfb;"
|81||June 30||Cardinals||5–1||Lohse (4–10)||Wainwright (6–7)||||32,538||31–50

|- style="text-align:center; background:#fbb;"
|82||July 1||Cardinals||11–7||Percival (2–0)||Bailey (2–2)||||24,126||31–51
|- style="text-align:center; background:#bfb;"
|83||July 3||Giants||7–3||Harang (9–2)||Correia (1–4)||||37,299||32–51
|- style="text-align:center; background:#fbb;"
|84||July 4||Giants||9–5||Cain (3–9)||Belisle (5–6)||||24,092||32–52
|- style="text-align:center; background:#bfb;"
|85||July 5||Giants||6–3||Arroyo (3–9)||Morris (7–5)||Weathers (16)||30,080||33–52
|- style="text-align:center; background:#bfb;"
|86||July 6||D-backs||8–1||Lohse (5–10)||Owings (5–4)||||20,445||34–52
|- style="text-align:center; background:#bfb;"
|87||July 7||D-backs||5–4||Coutlangus (4–1)||Peña (3–2)||Weathers (17)||34,410||35–52
|- style="text-align:center; background:#bfb;"
|88||July 8||D-backs||4–3 ||Saarloos (1–4)||Valverde (0–3)||||28,169||36–52
|- style="text-align:center; background:#fbb;"
|89||July 12||@ Mets||3–2||Hernández (5–4)||Arroyo (3–10)||Wagner (18)||48,282||36–53
|- style="text-align:center; background:#bfb;"
|90||July 13||@ Mets||8–4||Harang (10–2)||Maine (10–5)||||51,305||37–53
|- style="text-align:center; background:#fbb;"
|91||July 14||@ Mets||2–1||Glavine (8–6)||Stanton (1–3)||Wagner (19)||51,742||37–54
|- style="text-align:center; background:#fbb;"
|92||July 15||@ Mets||5–2||Pérez (8–6)||Lohse (5–11)||Wagner (20)||52,186||37–55
|- style="text-align:center; background:#bfb;"
|93||July 16||@ Braves||10–3||Livingston (2–0)||Davies (4–8)||||24,442||38–55
|- style="text-align:center; background:#bfb;"
|94||July 17||@ Braves||6–5||Arroyo (4–10)||Reyes (0–1)||Weathers (18)||30,072||39–55
|- style="text-align:center; background:#bfb;"
|95||July 18||@ Braves||6–5 ||Gosling (1–0)||Ascanio (0–1)||||33,789||40–55
|- style="text-align:center; background:#bfb;"
|96||July 19||@ Marlins||7–5||Coffey (2–1)||Benítez (2–5)||Weathers (19)||10,344||41–55
|- style="text-align:center; background:#fbb;"
|97||July 20||@ Marlins||10–2||Olsen (8–7)||Lohse (5–12)||||15,313||41–56
|- style="text-align:center; background:#fbb;"
|98||July 21||@ Marlins||11–1||Kim (5–5)||Livingston (2–1)||||21,823||41–57
|- style="text-align:center; background:#fbb;"
|99||July 22||@ Marlins||9–3||Pinto (2–3)||Arroyo (4–11)||||14,123||41–58
|- style="text-align:center; background:#bfb;"
|100||July 23||Brewers||2–1 ||Burton (1–1)||Balfour (0–2)||||23,489||42–58
|- style="text-align:center; background:#fbb;"
|101||July 24||Brewers||5–3||Gallardo (3–1)||Belisle (5–7)||Cordero (32)||18,284||42–59
|- style="text-align:center; background:#bfb;"
|102||July 25||Brewers||7–3||Lohse (6–12)||Suppan (8–9)||Weathers (20)||30,976||43–59
|- style="text-align:center; background:#bfb;"
|103||July 26||Brewers||6–5 ||Burton (2–1)||Cordero (0–3)||||24,170||44–59
|- style="text-align:center; background:#bfb;"
|104||July 27||Cubs||5–4||Weathers (2–3)||Howry (5–6)||||36,635||45–59
|- style="text-align:center; background:#fbb;"
|105||July 28||Cubs||8–1||Marshall (5–4)||Harang (10–3)||||42,365||45–60
|- style="text-align:center; background:#fbb;"
|106||July 29||Cubs||6–0||Zambrano (14–7)||Belisle (5–8)||||33,061||45–61
|- style="text-align:center; background:#fbb;"
|107||July 31||@ Nationals||6–3||Chico (5–6)||Livingston (2–2)||Cordero (22)||20,165||45–62

|- style="text-align:center; background:#fbb;"
|108||August 1||@ Nationals||7–2||Lannan (1–0)||Arroyo (4–12)||||28,944||45–63
|- style="text-align:center; background:#fbb;"
|109||August 2||@ Nationals||7–3||Bacsik (5–6)||Dumatrait (0–1)||||26,223||45–64
|- style="text-align:center; background:#bfb;"
|110||August 3||@ Pirates||13–4||Belisle (6–8)||Snell (7–10)||||22,874||46–64
|- style="text-align:center; background:#bfb;"
|111||August 4||@ Pirates||9–8 ||Burton (3–1)||Capps (4–5)||Weathers (21)||33,466||47–64
|- style="text-align:center; background:#bbb;"
|--||August 5||@ Pirates||colspan=5|Postponed (rain) ||47–64
|- style="text-align:center; background:#bfb;"
|112||August 7||Dodgers||4–0||Arroyo (5–12)||Hendrickson (4–6)||||22,057||48–64
|- style="text-align:center; background:#bfb;"
|113||August 8||Dodgers||1–0||Harang (11–3)||Billingsley (7–3)||Weathers (22)||20,462||49–64
|- style="text-align:center; background:#fbb;"
|114||August 9||Dodgers||5–4 ||Proctor (3–5)||Santos (1–4)||Saito (28)||25,965||49–65
|- style="text-align:center; background:#fbb;"
|115||August 10||Padres||12–7 ||Cameron (1–0)||Weathers (2–4)||||21,594||49–66
|- style="text-align:center; background:#bfb;"
|116||August 11||Padres||8–3||Livingston (3–2)||Hampson (2–3)||||27,381||50–66
|- style="text-align:center; background:#fbb;"
|117||August 12||Padres||10–4||Peavy (13–5)||Arroyo (5–13)||||31,297||50–67
|- style="text-align:center; background:#bfb;"
|118||August 14||@ Cubs||6–5||Harang (12–3)||Zambrano (14–9)||Weathers (23)||40,750||51–67
|- style="text-align:center; background:#bfb;"
|119||August 15||@ Cubs||11–9||Bray (1–0)||Howry (5–7)||Weathers (24)||40,162||52–67
|- style="text-align:center; background:#fbb;"
|120||August 16||@ Cubs||12–4||Marquis (10–7)||Livingston (3–3)||||40,372||52–68
|- style="text-align:center; background:#bfb;"
|121||August 17||@ Brewers||8–3||Arroyo (6–13)||Suppan (8–10)||||41,008||53–68
|- style="text-align:center; background:#fbb;"
|122||August 18||@ Brewers||8–4||Vargas (10–4)||Ramírez (0–1)||||43,087||53–69
|- style="text-align:center; background:#bfb;"
|123||August 19||@ Brewers||7–6||Bray (2–0)||Linebrink (4–4)||Weathers (25)||42,398||54–69
|- style="text-align:center; background:#fbb;"
|124||August 20||Braves||14–4||Hudson (15–5)||Dumatrait (0–2)||||24,477||54–70
|- style="text-align:center; background:#bfb;"
|125||August 21||Braves||8–7||Bray (3–0)||Moylan (4–3)||Weathers (26)||21,039||55–70
|- style="text-align:center; background:#bfb;"
|126||August 22||Braves||4–2||Arroyo (7–13)||Cormier (0–4)||Weathers (27)||22,924||56–70
|- style="text-align:center; background:#bfb;"
|127||August 23||Braves||9–7 ||Gosling (2–0)||Wickman (3–3)||||22,052||57–70
|- style="text-align:center; background:#bfb;"
|128||August 24||Marlins||5–3||Harang (13–3)||Willis (8–13)||Weathers (28)||25,773||58–70
|- style="text-align:center; background:#bfb;"
|129||August 25||Marlins||11–7||Belisle (7–8)||Mitre (5–7)||||32,288||59–70
|- style="text-align:center; background:#bfb;"
|130||August 26||Marlins||9–3||Shearn (1–0)||Barone (0–2)||||23,122||60–70
|- style="text-align:center; background:#fbb;"
|131||August 28||@ Pirates||6–4||Gorzelanny (13–7)||Ramírez (0–2)||Capps (14)||||60–71
|- style="text-align:center; background:#fbb;"
|132||August 28||@ Pirates||3–2||Chacón (5–4)||Bray (3–1)||Capps (15)||17,669||60–72
|- style="text-align:center; background:#bfb;"
|133||August 29||@ Pirates||8–0||Harang (14–3)||Snell (8–11)||||14,191||61–72
|- style="text-align:center; background:#bfb;"
|134||August 30||@ Pirates||5–4||Burton (4–1)||Capps (4–6)||Weathers (29)||12,643||62–72
|- style="text-align:center; background:#fbb;"
|135||August 31||@ Cardinals||8–5||Flores (2–0)||Majewski (0–2)||||43,564||62–73

|- style="text-align:center; background:#fbb;"
|136||September 1||@ Cardinals||11–3||Wainwright (13–9)||Dumatrait (0–3)||||42,356||62–74
|- style="text-align:center; background:#fbb;"
|137||September 2||@ Cardinals||3–2||Looper (12–10)||Arroyo (7–14)||Isringhausen (28)||44,223||62–75
|- style="text-align:center; background:#fbb;"
|138||September 3||Mets||10–4||Martínez (1–0)||Harang (14–4)||||29,290||62–76
|- style="text-align:center; background:#fbb;"
|139||September 4||Mets||11–7||Pérez (13–9)||Bray (3–2)||||20,655||62–77
|- style="text-align:center; background:#bfb;"
|140||September 5||Mets||7–0||Shearn (2–0)||Maine (14–9)||||15,704||63–77
|- style="text-align:center; background:#bfb;"
|141||September 7||Brewers||11–4||Arroyo (8–14)||Bush (11–10)||||21,006||64–77
|- style="text-align:center; background:#fbb;"
|142||September 8||Brewers||4–3||Turnbow (4–4)||Weathers (2–5)||Cordero (41)||22,758||64–78
|- style="text-align:center; background:#fbb;"
|143||September 9||Brewers||10–5||Sheets (12–4)||Dumatrait (0–4)||||21,534||64–79
|- style="text-align:center; background:#bfb;"
|144||September 11||Cardinals||7–2||Belisle (8–8)||Mulder (0–2)||||14,027||65–79
|- style="text-align:center; background:#bfb;"
|145||September 12||Cardinals||5–1||Arroyo (9–14)||Reyes (2–14)||||16,167||66–79
|- style="text-align:center; background:#bfb;"
|146||September 13||Cardinals||5–4||Harang (15–4)||Wells (6–17)||Weathers (30)||18,018||67–79
|- style="text-align:center; background:#bfb;"
|147||September 14||@ Brewers||6–5||Shearn (3–0)||Sheets (12–5)||Bray (1)||42,944||68–79
|- style="text-align:center; background:#fbb;"
|148||September 15||@ Brewers||5–3||Suppan (10–11)||Saarloos (1–5)||Cordero (42)||40,710||68–80
|- style="text-align:center; background:#fbb;"
|149||September 16||@ Brewers||5–2||Villanueva (8–4)||Belisle (8–9)||Cordero (43)||31,150||68–81
|- style="text-align:center; background:#fbb;"
|150||September 17||@ Cubs||7–6||Ohman (2–4)||Weathers (2–6)||||39,075||68–82
|- style="text-align:center; background:#bfb;"
|151||September 18||@ Cubs||5–2||Harang (16–4)||Zambrano (16–13)||Weathers (31)||40,801||69–82
|- style="text-align:center; background:#fbb;"
|152||September 19||@ Cubs||3–2||Howry (6–7)||Majewski (0–3)||||40,805||69–83
|- style="text-align:center; background:#bfb;"
|153||September 20||@ Giants||4–2||Bailey (3–2)||Cain (7–16)||Weathers (32)||35,019||70–83
|- style="text-align:center; background:#bfb;"
|154||September 21||@ Giants||9–8 ||McBeth (3–2)||Munter (1–1)||Weathers (33)||35,502||71–83
|- style="text-align:center; background:#fbb;"
|155||September 22||@ Giants||2–0||Hennessey (4–5)||Bray (3–3)||Wilson (5)||36,375||71–84
|- style="text-align:center; background:#fbb;"
|156||September 23||@ Giants||5–4||Messenger (2–4)||Harang (16–5)||Wilson (6)||38,029||71–85
|- style="text-align:center; background:#fbb;"
|157||September 25||Astros||8–5||Paulino (1–1)||Coutlangus (4–2)||Lidge (17)||13,261||71–86
|- style="text-align:center; background:#fbb;"
|158||September 26||Astros||7–6||Sarfate (1–0)||Burton (4–2)||Qualls (5)||13,138||71–87
|- style="text-align:center; background:#fbb;"
|159||September 27||Astros||4–3||Borkowski (5–3)||Majewski (0–4)||Lidge (18)||13,626||71–88
|- style="text-align:center; background:#fbb;"
|160||September 28||Cubs||6–0||Zambrano (18–13)||Arroyo (9–15)||||32,193||71–89
|- style="text-align:center; background:#fbb;"
|161||September 29||Cubs||4–0||Hill (11–8)||Harang (16–6)||||38,936||71–90
|- style="text-align:center; background:#bfb;"
|162||September 30||Cubs||8–4||Bailey (4–2)||Dempster (2–7)||||32,620||72–90

Player stats

Batting

Starters by position
Note: Pos = Position; G = Games played; AB = At bats; H = Hits; Avg. = Batting average; HR = Home runs; RBI = Runs batted in

Other batters
Note: G = Games played; AB = At bats; H = Hits; Avg. = Batting average; HR = Home runs; RBI = Runs batted in

Pitching

Starting pitchers
Note: G = Games pitched; IP = Innings pitched; W = Wins; L = Losses; ERA = Earned run average; SO = Strikeouts

Relief pitchers
Note: G = Games pitched; W = Wins; L = Losses; SV = Saves; ERA = Earned run average; SO = Strikeouts

Farm system

References

2007 Cincinnati Reds season at Baseball Reference

Cincinnati Reds seasons
Cincinnati Reds season
Cinc